Albert Herman Schellhase (September 13, 1864 – January 3, 1919) was a Major League Baseball player. He was primarily an outfielder with the Boston Beaneaters of the National League in 1890 and played catcher for the 1891 Louisville Colonels of the American Association.

External links

1864 births
1919 deaths
19th-century baseball players
Major League Baseball catchers
Major League Baseball outfielders
Boston Beaneaters players
Louisville Colonels players
Nashville Americans players
Acid Iron Earths players
Syracuse Stars (minor league baseball) players
St. Joseph Clay Eaters players
Sioux City Corn Huskers players
Evansville Hoosiers players
Baseball players from Indiana
Sportspeople from Evansville, Indiana